Priya Naree Cooper,  (born 2 October 1974) is an Australian world champion disabled swimmer, winning nine Paralympic gold medals as well as world records and world championships. She competed in the Australian swimming team at the 1992, 1996 and 2000 Summer Paralympics with an S8 classification. She was twice the co-captain of the Australian Paralympic team, including at the 2000 Paralympic Games in Sydney, and carried the Australian flag at the closing ceremonies for the 1992 and 1996 Summer Paralympics. Cooper has cerebral palsy and spends much of her time in a wheelchair. She attended university, working on a course in health management. After she ended her competitive Paralympic career, she became a commentator, and covered the swimming events at the 2002 Commonwealth Games.

Early life
Priya Naree Cooper was born on 2 October 1974 in Perth, Western Australia. She was born with cerebral palsy, and spends 75% of her time in a wheelchair. As a youngster, her mother encouraged her to try out several sports, including tap dancing and ballet.

With her father's encouragement, Cooper first started swimming in her backyard pool when she was six years old. Her first swimsuit was a bikini. Her father taught her to swim while making her wear big yellow floaties. She started competitive swimming at school carnivals. In the first carnival she competed in, she finished siXth in the F-division 50 m butterfly. She was informed about disabled athletes by a teacher at school. Her initial reaction to learning about disabled sport was to question if she was "disabled enough" to compete. She made her first national team appearance when she was in year 12 in school, after winning twelve gold medals in national swimming meets. By that time, Cooper had already begun serious training, waking up at 4 a.m. to make sure she had time in the pool.

Competitive athletic career

Cooper is a world champion disabled swimmer, winning nine Paralympic gold medals as well as world records and world championships. She represented Wheelchair Sports Western Australia at the 1991 National Wheelchair Games, winning nine gold medals. Her home pool was the Swan Park Leisure Centre in Midvale, Western Australia. She had a number of coaches over the course of her competitive career, including Matthew Brown and Frank Ponta.

At the age of 17, Cooper made her Paralympic debut at the 1992 Summer Paralympics in Barcelona. She was in danger of not going to the 1992 Paralympics because of funding issues for the Australian Paralympic Federation. The Federation made an emergency appeal for funding from the public in order to cover the cost of transporting the Australian team to Barcelona. A variety of small donations allowed Cooper and other Australian athletes to compete. She won three gold and two silver medals, and broke two world records and three Paralympic records. She was offered a non-residential Australian Institute of Sport Athletes with a Disability swimming scholarship in 1993 and was supported until 2000.

Cooper was a co-captain of the Australian team at the 1996 Summer Paralympics, where she competed in six individual events and two relay events in the S8 class, winning five gold medals, four individual and one team, one silver medal and one bronze medal. She set world records at the 1996 Paralympic Games in Atlanta in the 200 m medley and the 400 m freestyle swimming events. She also set personal bests in the 100 m backstroke and 100 m freestyle. Her world record time in the 400 m freestyle was 5:11.47, her 100 m backstroke time was 1:23.43, and her 100 m freestyle time was 1:12.08.

In 1998, Cooper competed at the Paralympic Swimming World Championships in Christchurch, New Zealand. She set a world record in the 400m freestyle at the event. She set another world record in the S8 classification, with an 800m freestyle time of 10:40.03, three seconds faster than the previous record. She also won a gold medal in the 200m individual medley, with a finish that was half a second away from beating her own previous world record.

Cooper competed at the Sporting Wheelies and Disabled Association-sponsored 1998 Queensland Championships in five swimming events. She and Brad Thomas were invited to attend as special guest competitors. While attending, Cooper also hosted a coaching clinic with Thomas.

In 1999, Cooper moved to Sydney, the location of the 2000 Summer Paralympics, to prepare for the Games. She had been living there for eighteen months at the beginning of the Games. Her family continued to live in Perth and the move was an adjustment period for her. She helped to make several instructional videos for the Sydney Organising Committee for the Olympic Games (SOCOG) to help train volunteers for the Games. In preparation for the 2000 Paralympics, the Australian Paralympic Committee created a CD to help with fundraising. She participated in this by choosing the song "Ashes" by The Superjesus and singing it onstage during the CD's launch.

At the 2000 Summer Paralympics, her last games, she was the co-captain of the Australian Paralympic team. Coming into the 2000 Games, there were some concerns that she would not be able to compete because of a shoulder injury. She was worried about how receptive Australians and the world would be in terms of disabled sport prior to the Paralympics being hosted in Australia.  She was surprised when the Paralympic Games started at how supportive Australians and international visitors were of athletes at the 2000 Paralympic Games. She won the 400 m freestyle and took three bronze medals in the 100 m freestyle, 4 x 100 m freestyle relay and 4 x 100 m medley relay events. After the Games, Cooper believed that they had a long reaching societal impact in terms of creating a better image for disabled people around the country and helping to increase acceptance of them as part of Australian society.  She also believed that the Games would help increase spectatorship for Paralympic sports around the country.

Cooper's swimming style relied on upper body strength, with her legs trailing behind her. Despite her love of water, Cooper had a fear of swimming in the open water of the ocean. To help overcome this fear, she competed in the 2002 open water  Rottnest Channel Swim in Western Australia.

Recognition

Cooper was selected to carry the Australian flag at the closing ceremonies for the 1992 and 1996 Summer Paralympics. She was awarded a Medal of the Order of Australia in 1993, was named the 1995 Paralympian of the Year, was the Young Australian of the Year for Sport in 1999, received an Australian Sports Medal in 2000, and was inducted into the Western Australian Hall of Champions in 2006 and the Swimming Western Australia Hall of Fame in 2008. In 1998, Cooper won a Dairy Farmers Sporting Chance award in swimming. That year, she also won a Curtin University of Technology John Curtin Medal. In 1999, she won the APC Merit Award.

Cooper was chosen to officially open the Stadium at Curtin University in 2009. She attended the tenth anniversary celebrations for the Sydney Olympic and Paralympic Games held at Sydney Olympic Park in 2010.

In October 2015, she became the fourth Paralympian to be inducted into the Sport Australia Hall of Fame.

In 2022, she was inducted into Paralympics Australia Hall of Fame.

Personal life
Cooper studied at Curtin University, where she graduated with a degree in health promotion and media. She was also a public speaker, attending events to talk about disabilities. Cooper had a volunteer position, where she worked as a scriptwriter for a radio station in Perth.

Cooper was a commentator for the 2002 Commonwealth Games, covering the swimming events. She is a Therapy Focus Ambassador, and a member of the Disabilities and Carer Council. She is actively involved in raising funds for several charities, and was part of the Great Pram Push event held in East Fremantle, Western Australia, a charity event that raised funds for the Starlight Children's Foundation and the Children's Leukaemia and Cancer Research Foundation.

In 2022, she was appointed Chair of the Western Australian Institute of Sport.

Cooper is married to Paralympic swimmer Rodney Bonsack and has two children. Bonsack had both legs severed above the knees in an aircraft accident in 1987. Priya and her husband run motivational business, Success is a Choice Global, which is designed to help people maximise their lives.

References

External links

 Cooper, Priya (1974 – ), The Australian Women's Register
 Who Are You? Priya Cooper ABC 15 August 2012

Female Paralympic swimmers of Australia
Paralympic gold medalists for Australia
Paralympic silver medalists for Australia
Paralympic bronze medalists for Australia
Swimmers at the 1992 Summer Paralympics
Swimmers at the 1996 Summer Paralympics
Swimmers at the 2000 Summer Paralympics
Medalists at the 1992 Summer Paralympics
Medalists at the 1996 Summer Paralympics
Medalists at the 2000 Summer Paralympics
Sportswomen from Western Australia
Swimmers from Perth, Western Australia
Australian female freestyle swimmers
Australian female backstroke swimmers
Australian female medley swimmers
Australian female butterfly swimmers
Australian Institute of Sport Paralympic swimmers
Western Australian Institute of Sport alumni
Australian sports broadcasters
Swimming commentators
Cerebral Palsy category Paralympic competitors
Swimmers with cerebral palsy
Recipients of the Medal of the Order of Australia
Recipients of the Australian Sports Medal
Sport Australia Hall of Fame inductees
Curtin University alumni
1974 births
Living people
Paralympic medalists in swimming
S8-classified Paralympic swimmers
20th-century Australian women
21st-century Australian women